The Martyr Mantras is the only studio album by Jesus Loves You and the fourth studio album by Boy George. It was credited to Jesus Loves You worldwide except in North America, where it was credited to Boy George upon its release there in 1991.

Composition
The Martyr Mantras contains many dance-orientated tracks, most of them with an electronic production. It is partly a collection of some of the songs that were released as one-off singles many months before ("No Clause 28" in 1988, "After the Love" in 1989, "Generations of Love" and "One On One" in 1990). The lead single was the Indian and house mash-up "Bow Down Mister" which reached the Top 30 in the UK Singles Chart.

George's songwriting credits are also on another alias, as "Angela Dust".

Critical reception
In a contemporaneous review in Keyboard, Jim Aikin described the album as "blue-eyed soul for the '90s".  He added that "[George] updates his British R&B roots very effectively with hip-hop beats and techno tricks".  Aikin also noted that, whatever the mood of any particular track,  "you feel that George is sincere". Dave Obee from Calgary Herald remarked that the former head of the Culture Club "has turned to house music, with all the computerized repetition a listener can stand. But that wonderfully pure voice rises above the rigid format, giving real life to each song." He highlighted George's "husky singing" on "Love's Gonna Let U Down", and his "stirring work" on "I Specialize In Loneliness". 

In an retrospective review for AllMusic, William Ruhlmann found the music to be "largely anonymous, if danceable", but singled out "Bow Down Mister" as an exception.

Commercial performance 
The Martyr Mantras was not a strong seller, only reaching #60 on the UK Albums Chart. Although it did fare better in European countries, The Martyr Mantras failed to enter the US Billboard Top 200.

Track listing
 "Generations of Love" (Oakenfold Mix) (Angela Dust, Caron Geary, Simon Rogers) - 7:12
 "One on One" (Brydon L.P. Mix) (Dust, Mark Brydon) - 4:41
 "Love's Gonna Let U Down" (Popcorn Mix) (Dust, Brydon) - 6:08
 "After the Love" (Ten Glorious Years Mix) (Dust, Jon Moss) - 7:41
 "I Specialise in Loneliness" (Dust, John Themis) - 6:24
 "No Clause 28" (Pascal Gabriel Mix) (Boy George O'Dowd, Glenn Nightingale, Ian Maidman, Richie Stevens, Steve Fletcher) - 6:20
 "Love Hurts" (L.P. Mix) (Dust, Bruce Forest, Richard Cottle) - 6:29
 "Siempre Te Amare" (Dust) - 6:07
 "Too Much Love" (Dust, Brydon) - 6:00
 "Bow Down Mister" (Dust) - 6:32
 "Generations of Love" (Seventies Mix) (CD only)

Personnel
 Boy George – vocals
 Jonathan Quarmby, Richard Cottle – keyboards
 Colin Elliot – percussion
 Jagdeep Singh – tabla
 Simeon Lister – saxophone
 Beverley Skeete, Derek Green, The Govinda All Stars, Helen Terry, Jacqui McKoy, Jagdeep Singh, Juliet Roberts, London Community Gospel Choir, Sharon McKoy, Stefan Ashton Frank – vocals

Production
Simon Rogers – producer (track 1 & 11)
 Mark Brydon – producer (tracks 2 & 3)
 Angela Dust – producer (tracks 4 & 9)
 Jon Moss – producer (track 4)
 John Themis – producer (track 5)
 Bobby Z – producer (track 6)
 Jeremy Healy – producer (track 6)
 Bruce Forest – producer (tracks 7 & 10)
 Zeo – producer (track 8)

Charts

References

External Links
 
 

1990 albums
Boy George albums
Virgin Records albums
Jesus Loves You (band) albums